Adelle August (12 February 1934 – 24 April 2005), was an American movie actress.

She was born in Kennewick, Washington as Adele M. Slaybough.  In 1952 she graduated from Highline High School, and was crowned Miss Washington USA the same year.  Two years later she was signed to Columbia Pictures.  Her brief career in the film industry lasted 1955–56 when she appeared in three films and a pair of television episodes, including the TV western Cheyenne in which she appeared as Jeremy Barnes in the 1955 episode "Julesburg." In addition to her acting career, she was a showgirl at the Tropicana Hotel in Las Vegas, Nevada.  She was married to Leonard Rogers in 1959, becoming Adelle M. Rogers.

Filmography
 1955 My Sister Eileen- Secretary (Uncredited)
 1955 Apache Ambush - Ann Parker
 1955 Women's Prison- Grace
 1956 The Best Things in Life Are Free- Chorus Girl (Uncredited) 
 1956 Hollywood or Bust- Dancer (Uncredited).

References

External links

 Adele August at tcm.com
 Adelle August at tcm.com
 

1934 births
2005 deaths
20th-century American actresses
American beauty pageant winners
American film actresses
American television actresses
Highline High School alumni
Miss Washington USA winners
Miss USA 1950s delegates
People from Kennewick, Washington
21st-century American women